Balapitiya is a coastal town, in south west Sri Lanka. It is located in the Southern Province in Sri Lanka. It is the nearest town to the Maduganga River.

Populated places in Southern Province, Sri Lanka